Whirlwind Glaciers is a set of four prominent converging glaciers which flow into the west side of Whirlwind Inlet on the east coast of the Antarctic Peninsula. Discovered by Sir Hubert Wilkins on his flight of December 20, 1928, the glaciers were so named because their relative position was suggestive of the radial cylinders of his Wright Whirlwind engine. The Whirlwind Glaciers, comprising Flint, Demorest, Matthes, and Chamberlin Glaciers, were photographed from the air by the United States Antarctic Service (USAS) in 1940; charted by the Falkland Islands Dependencies Survey (FIDS) in 1948.

Further reading 

 Defense mapping agency  hydrographic/Topographic Center, Antarctic ice-shelf Sailing Directions (planning Guide) and (enroute) for Antarctica, P 274

External links 

 Whirlwind Glaciers on USGS website
 Whirlwind Glaciers on SCAR website

References 

Glaciers of Graham Land
Bowman Coast